Peer Gynt is a 1934 German drama film directed by Fritz Wendhausen and starring Hans Albers, Lucie Höflich and Marieluise Claudius. It is based on the play Peer Gynt by Henrik Ibsen.

It was one of the most expensive productions made by Bavaria Film and involved location shooting in Norway. The film's sets were designed by the art directors Karl Vollbrecht and Hermann Warm.

Cast
 Hans Albers as Peer Gynt
 Lucie Höflich as Mutter Aase
 Marieluise Claudius as Solveig
 Ellen Frank as Ingrid
 Olga Tschechowa as Baronin
 Lizzi Waldmüller as Tatjana
 Zehra Achmed as Anitra
 Richard Ryen as Gunarson
 Hans Schultze as Schmied Aslak
 F. W. Schröder-Schrom as Vater Solveigs
 Leopoldine Sangora a sMutter Solveigs
 Friedrich Kayßler as Kiensley
 Otto Wernicke as Parker
 Fritz Odemar as Silvan
 Alfred Döderlein as Mats Moen
 Mina Höcker-Behrens as Frau Rink
 Philipp Veit as Landstreicher
 Magda Lena as Eine Bäuerin
 Armand Zäpfel as Kapitän
 Willem Holsboer as John Bless
 O. E. Hasse as Steuermann
 Viktor Bell as Diener Ben

References

Bibliography

External links

1934 films
German drama films
1930s German-language films
Films directed by Fritz Wendhausen
German films based on plays
Films based on works by Henrik Ibsen
Films set in Norway
Films of Nazi Germany
Works based on Peer Gynt
Bavaria Film films
Films shot at Bavaria Studios
German black-and-white films
1934 drama films
1930s German films